"Russian Radio" is a song by the British-American synthpop duo Red Flag, released as a single in 1988. The song charted highly on the US Billboard Hot Dance Club Play chart, peaking at No. 11.

Track listings
12" single
A1. "Russian Radio" (Glasnost Club Mix) 7:28
B1. "Russian Radio" (Radio Moscow Edit) 3:30
B2. "Russian Radio" (Tremont and Webster Mix) 4:40

12" maxi-single
A1. "Russian Radio" (Razormaid Club Mix) 6:13
A2. "Russian Radio" (Fresh Club Mix) 3:42
A3. "Russian Radio" (12" Dub Mix) 6:44
B1. "Russian Radio" (Glasnost Club Mix) 7:28
B2. "Russian Radio" (Tremont and Webster Mix) 4:40
B3. "Russian Radio" (Radio Moscow Edit) 3:30

CD maxi-single
 "Russian Radio" (Glasnost Club Mix) 7:28
 "Russian Radio (Radio Moscow Edit) 3:30
 "Russian Radio" (Tremont and Webster Mix) 4:40
 "Broken Heart" (Radio edit) 3:50
 "Broken Heart" (U.K. Remix) 5:16
 "Broken Heart" (Extended Remix) 5:41
 "Control" 5:30
 "Re-Broken" 0:59

CD promo-single
 "Russian Radio" (Fresh Radio Mix) 3:42
 "Russian Radio" (Single Radio Mix) 3:30

Cassette maxi-single
A. "Russian Radio" (Razormaid Club Mix) (6:13)
B1. "Russian Radio" (Fresh Radio Mix) (3:42)
B2. "Broken Heart" (U.K. Remix) (5:16)

Chart position

References

1988 songs
1988 singles
Red Flag (band) songs
Enigma Records singles